Oliver Henry Wallop, 8th Earl of Portsmouth (13 January 1861 – 10 February 1943), was a British peer and also served in the Wyoming State Legislature in the United States.

Wallop was born at Eggesford House in Devon, England, to Isaac Newton Fellowes (later Wallop), 5th Earl of Portsmouth, and Lady Eveline Alicia Juliana Herbert, daughter of Henry Herbert, 3rd Earl of Carnarvon. As the third son, he was not expected to inherit his father's earldom, and in 1883 moved to the American West to become a rancher and stockman. He settled in Miles City, Montana, before coming to Big Horn, Wyoming, and purchasing the Canyon Ranch in 1895. He became a United States citizen in 1904 and, as O. H. Wallop, was first elected to the Wyoming Legislature in 1908, serving two terms as a Republican in the Wyoming House of Representatives.

From 1917 to 1919, he served in the British Army in the First World War.

Wyoming
In 1884, at the age of twenty-eight, Wallop immigrated to the United States. With his remittance, he capitalized a horse ranch near Miles City, Montana. Two English-bred stallions, a gift from his father, helped him begin his horse-breeding operation. In 1890, Wallop bought a homestead near Big Horn, Wyoming. There, he began to raise and to train polo ponies and tandem horse teams. He trailed them to the railroad for shipment to the East Coast and to England. Five years later, he bought another ranch at the mouth of Little Goose Creek, named it the Canyon Ranch, and moved his operation there.

In 1899, he partnered with his neighbors, fellow British expatriates William and Malcolm Moncreiffe, in an expanded horse business. At the time, a horse in Wyoming might sell for between five and thirty-nine dollars. Wallop and his partners bought horses at relatively inexpensive prices, trained them, and sold them to the British cavalry for as much as ninety-seven dollars. During the three years of the Second Boer War in what is now South Africa, the operation shipped more than twenty thousand horses. During World War I, Wallop and his partners supplied horses to the British, French, and Italian armies. Wallop himself took the role of horse buyer in Oregon and Washington state. In peacetime, Wallop continued to breed and train polo ponies.

England
Wallop's elder brothers, the 6th and 7th earls, both died without male heirs. In 1925, he succeeded as the 8th Earl. Wallop was allowed to take his seat in the House of Lords after first renouncing his American citizenship.

Wallop died in Colorado Springs, Colorado, in 1943, after being ill for a year.

Marriage and issue
Wallop married Marguerite Walker, daughter of Samuel Johnson Walker of Kentucky, and Amanda née Morehead, and had two sons, Gerard Vernon Wallop and Oliver Malcolm Wallop.

His granddaughter Jean ("Jeanie") Margaret Wallop (1935–2019), born in Big Horn, Wyoming, married Henry Herbert, 7th Earl of Carnarvon, whose seat was Highclere Castle. She was close friends with Queen Elizabeth II, who is godmother to his great-grandson George Herbert, 8th Earl of Carnarvon. His grandson Malcolm Wallop also served in the Wyoming State Legislature, and three terms in the United States Senate.

References

External links

1861 births
1943 deaths
British expatriates in the United States
People from Sheridan, Wyoming
8
Republican Party members of the Wyoming House of Representatives
Ranchers from Wyoming
Oliver
Former United States citizens
19th-century American politicians
Cowboys
People from Mid Devon District